Jinyu Liu (刘津瑜)  (born 1972) is Professor of Classics at DePauw University and Distinguished Guest Professor at Shanghai Normal University (Chinese: 上海师范大学)). She is an expert in Roman history, social history, translation, the reception of Graeco-Roman classics in China, and Latin epigraphy.

Early life and education 
Liu was born and raised in China. She received her BA in 1993 and her MA in 1996 from Nanjing University (南京大學) where she studied Greek and Roman history, and Chinese literature and history. She received her PhD from Columbia University in 2004. Her thesis was entitled Occupation, Social Organization, and Public Service in the collegia centonariorum.

Career 
Liu began employment at DePauw University in 2004 as Assistant Professor. Liu was the recipient of an Andrew W. Mellon Foundation’s New Directions Fellowship (2011–2014) and holds Shanghai "1000 Plan" Distinguished Guest Professorship at Shanghai Normal University (2014–2019). She was a visiting professor at Peking University, 2011–2012. Liu is the Principal Investigator of the project 'Translating the Complete Corpus of Ovid’s poetry into Chinese with Commentaries', funded by the Chinese National Social Science Foundation, 2015–2020. The project involves translating Ovid's Fasti and exile poetry from Latin to Chinese for the first time. Ovid's other poems will be re-translated, all with commentaries. Liu received a Loeb Classical Library Foundation Fellowship (2018–2019) for her project entitled 'Ovid's Tristia: A Chinese Translation and Commentary'. Liu was a keynote speaker at the 2020 annual meeting of the Association of Ancient Historians. She delivered the 10th annual Grimshaw-Gudewicz Lecture at Brown University in 2019 and the Clack Lecture at the 2020 annual meeting of the Classical Association of the Atlantic States.

Bibliography 

 Collegia Centonariorum: the Guilds of Textile Dealers in the Roman West (Leiden: Brill, 2009), 
 'Professional Associations', The Cambridge Companion to Ancient Rome, ed. by Paul Erdkamp (Cambridge: Cambridge University Press, 2013)
 An Introduction to the Study of Roman History (in Chinese) (Peking: Peking University Press, 2014) (review, in Chinese)
 'AE 1998, 282: a case study of public benefaction and local politics', Ancient documents and their contexts : First North American Congress of Greek and Latin Epigraphy (2011), edited by John Bodel and Nora Dimitrova (Boston: Brill, 2014)
 'Group Membership, Trust Networks, and Social Capital: A Critical Analysis', Work, Labour, and Professions in the Roman World, edited by Koenraad Verboven and Christian Laes (Leiden: Brill, 2016)
 'Late Antique fora and public honor in the Western cities: case studies', Shifting cultural frontiers in late antiquity, ed. by David Brakke (London: Routledge, 2016)
 'Toward a New Mode of Vernacular Chinese: A Study on Zhou Zuoren's Modern Translation of Theocritus' Id. 10', Receptions of Greek and Roman antiquity in East Asia, edited by Almut-Barbara Renger, Xin Fan (Leiden: Brill, 2018)
 (ed. with Thomas J. Sienkewicz) Ovid in China. Reception, Translation, and Comparison (Leiden: Brill, 2022)

References

Further reading
Adrienne K.H. Rose, The Art of Translation: An Interview with Jinyu Liu, Society for Classical Studies blog, April 15, 2020

External links 
Personal blog
Staff Profile Page, DePauw University

Classics educators
Columbia University alumni
Chinese women academics
1972 births
Women classical scholars
DePauw University faculty
Nanjing University alumni
Living people